Lu Jiang (born June 30, 1981 in Beijing) is a Chinese football player who plays for Chinese League One side Beijing Baxy.

Club career 
Lu Jiang started his professional football career with Beijing Guoan in 2000 as a highly promising young midfielder who came from the club's youth team. He would progress within the team establishing himself as a squad regular until the beginning of the 2002 league season when new Beijing Guoan Head coach Ljupko Petrović promoted Lu Jiang as a first choice regular within the team. Lu Jiang would then spend several seasons as a vital member within the Beijing team, however the club were not regular title contenders and they brought in Shen Xiangfu as their new Head coach in 2005, this would however see Lu Jiang finding himself increasingly dropped from the team during the end of the season. Lu Jiang's performances saw him relegated to a squad player throughout the 2006 league season and it was only when Lee Jang-Soo came in to manage the team in 2007 was he able to get some more playing time. Under Lee Jang-Soo's reign he would become a versatile player able to play as a right back and with the sudden retirement of the team's right back Zhang Shuai at the end of the 2008 league season Lu Jiang would establish himself as a first choice regular once more within the team even after being banned for eight games after having a scuffle with Li Weifeng in a league game on September 27, 2008 against Wuhan Optics Valley. Despite Zhou Ting going on to become Beijing's first choice right back Lu Jiang would gain significant playing time and go on to win the 2009 Chinese Super League title with the club. By 2011 Lu Jiang's playing time would significantly drop at Beijing and he was allowed to leave the club to join second tier team Hunan Billows at the beginning of the 2012 league season.

International career 
Lu Jiang would be called into the Chinese U-21 team and would be promoted to the senior team once he established himself within the Beijing Guoan on December 7, 2002 for a friendly against Syria in a game that China won 3-1
.

Honours 
 Beijing Guoan F.C.
 Chinese Super League: 2009
 Chinese FA Cup: 2003
 Chinese Football Super Cup: 2003

References

External links 
 
 Player profile at Sina website
 

1981 births
Living people
Chinese footballers
Footballers from Beijing
China international footballers
Beijing Guoan F.C. players
Beijing Sport University F.C. players
Chinese Super League players
China League One players
Footballers at the 2002 Asian Games
Association football midfielders
Asian Games competitors for China